These are some notable tornadoes, tornado outbreaks, and tornado outbreak sequences that have occurred in North America.
The listing is U.S.-centric, with greater and more consistent information available for U.S. tornadoes. Some North American outbreaks affecting the U.S. may only include tornado information from the U.S.
Exact death and injury counts are not possible, especially for large events and events before 1950.
Prior to 1950 in the United States, only significant tornadoes (rated F2 or higher or causing a fatality) are listed for the number of tornadoes in outbreaks. These ratings are estimates from tornado expert Tom Grazulis and are not official.
Due to increasing detection, particularly in the U.S., numbers of counted tornadoes have increased markedly in recent decades although number of actual tornadoes and counted significant tornadoes has not. In older events, the number of tornadoes officially counted is likely underestimated.
Historical context: Much of the tornado activity in the American Midwestern area is relatively unknown and significantly under-reported prior to the middle of the 1800s as few people lived there to record the yearly activity. The American government did not acquire the Midwestern states area until the 1803 Louisiana Purchase from the French government. The Louisiana Purchase area included major tornado activity areas of north Texas, Oklahoma, Kansas, Nebraska, Arkansas, Missouri, Iowa, South Dakota, and lower Minnesota. Large groups of settlers and pioneers only began populating the region after 1820. As these areas began being more populated, existing tornado activity there became more known and reported through newspaper and telegraph.
Where applicable, a count of the number of significant (F2/EF2 and stronger), violent (F4/EF4 and stronger), and killer tornadoes is included for outbreaks.

United States

1643–1859

1860s

1870s

1880s

1890s

1900s

1910s

1920s

1930s

1940s

1950s

1960s

1970s

1980s

1990s

2000s

2010s

2020s

Canada

Mexico, Central America, Caribbean, and other areas

See also

Lists of tornadoes and tornado outbreaks
List of Canadian tornadoes and tornado outbreaks
List of North American tornadoes and tornado outbreaks
List of 21st-century Canadian tornadoes and tornado outbreaks
List of Connecticut tornadoes
List of tornadoes in Washington, D.C.
List of Rhode Island tornadoes
Tornado records
Tornadoes in Bermuda
Tornadoes in the United States
List of tornadoes striking downtown areas

Notes

References
Grazulis, Thomas P. (1993). Significant Tornadoes 1680–1991, A Chronology and Analysis of Events. St. Johnsbury, Vermont: The Tornado Project of Environmental Films. 
 --- (1997). Significant Tornadoes Update, 1992–1995. 
 --- (2001). The Tornado: Nature's Ultimate Windstorm. Norman, Oklahoma: University of Oklahoma Press. 
National Oceanic and Atmospheric Administration, National Climatic Data Center / Storm Prediction Center. Storm Data.

External links 
North America listing by The Tornado Project
Central America and Caribbean listing by The Tornado Project
Deadly Skies: Canada's Most Destructive Tornadoes (CBC)
All US Tornadoes From 1950–present
US Tornado Paths by Day and Zip code

Tornadoes and tornado outbreaks
Tornado-related lists